Julien Belgy (born 6 May 1983 in Niort, Deux-Sèvres) is a French former professional cyclo-cross and road cyclist.

Major results

Cyclo-cross

2001-2001
  U19 Cyclo-Cross Champion
2002–2003
 2nd, National U23 Cyclo-Cross Championship
2003–2004
 2nd, National U23 Cyclo-Cross Championship
2004–2005
 3rd, National U23 Cyclo-Cross Championship
2005–2006
 1st in Buxerolles
2007–2008
 1st, Overall, Tour du Val d'Orge
 1st, Stages 1 & 3
 1st in Pageas, Dijon, Camors & Lanarvily

Road

2005
 1st, Stage 8, Tour de la Guadeloupe

External links 
 

1983 births
Living people
People from Niort
French male cyclists
Tour de Guadeloupe stage winners
Sportspeople from Deux-Sèvres
Cyclo-cross cyclists
Cyclists from Nouvelle-Aquitaine